Reuben Knecht Bachman (August 6, 1834 – September 19, 1911) was a Democratic member of the U.S. House of Representatives from Pennsylvania.

Reuben K. Bachman was born in Williams Township, Northampton County, Pennsylvania.  He attended the common schools, and taught school for several years.  He entered the mercantile and milling business in Durham, Pennsylvania. He owned and operated the Durham Mill.

Bachman was elected as a Democrat to the Forty-sixth Congress.  He was not a candidate for renomination in 1880.  He was a delegate to the 1884 Democratic National Convention at Chicago.  He engaged in the lumber business and the manufacture of builders' millwork at Riegelsville, Pennsylvania, and Phillipsburg, New Jersey.  He died in Easton, Pennsylvania.  Interment in Durham Cemetery, near Durham.

Sources

 The Political Graveyard

1834 births
1911 deaths
19th-century American politicians
Democratic Party members of the United States House of Representatives from Pennsylvania